Zeiller is a surname. Notable people with the surname include:

Charles René Zeiller (1847–1915), French mining engineer and paleobotanist
Johann Jakob Zeiller (1708–1783), Austrian painter
Paul Zeiller (1658–1738), Austrian painter

See also
Zeiler
Zeller (surname)